Scrubb is a surname of English origin. People with the name include:

 Andre Scrubb (born 1995), American baseball player
 Jay Scrubb (born 2000), American basketball player
 Philip Scrubb (born 1992), Canadian professional basketball player of British descent
 Thomas Scrubb (born 1991), Canadian professional basketball player of British descent

Fictional characters 
 Eustace Scrubb, fictional character in C. S. Lewis's Chronicles of Narnia

Arts, entertainment, and media 
 Scrubb (band), a Thai band

See also 
 Ken Scrubbs, pastor

English-language surnames